Dangerous Game (also known as Snake Eyes) is a 1993 drama film directed by Abel Ferrara, written by Nicholas St. John, and starring Madonna, Harvey Keitel, and James Russo.

Plot
Utilizing a film-within-a-film format, the overall plot involves New York City-based director Eddie Israel directing actors Sarah Jennings and Frank Burns in a Hollywood marital-crisis drama, Mother of Mirrors, which is about a formerly wealthy but unemployed husband who berates his newly religious wife about what he considers her hypocritical aversion to their sex-and-drug lifestyle. During the shooting of that film, Israel becomes more and more demanding of his actors, growing increasingly obsessive with finding the ugly truths beneath the story's surface. All the while, his own carelessness and bad behavior with his own family begins to erode him and to corrode his marriage to Madlyn.

Cast

Release
Dangerous Game opened in US theaters on November 19, 1993. In 2007, Ferrara recalled,

This was the first production by Madonna's Maverick Picture Company, a division of the newly formed entertainment company Maverick.

In Japan, the film was released under the name Body II as a sequel to Madonna's other 1993 film Body of Evidence which had previously been released as Body. Neither film is directly connected to each other in narrative nor storyline. The video release of the film was banned in Ireland, most likely due to a violent rape scene. The cinema distributors (Abbey Films) never submitted it for an Irish theatrical release. The decision was appealed by PolyGram Filmed Entertainment – the viewing took place on 23 November, where the ban was upheld.

Critical reception
The film received mixed reviews from critics. Review aggregator website Rotten Tomatoes reports that 31% of 16 reviews were positive, with an average rating of 4.09/10.

Both The New York Times and the Los Angeles Times praised Dangerous Game, with Janet Maslin of the former complimenting both Keitel and Madonna for their acting, and admiring the film's "raw, corrosive" quality: "Shot in a grainy, urgent style with occasional lapses into video, it has a fury that goes well beyond the story at hand, and an energy level that transcends the story's self-indulgence. This tough, abrasive film maker is seldom without his deadly serious side. 'Dangerous Game' is angry and painful, and the pain feels real." Kevin Thomas of the Los Angeles Times found it "compelling and explosive", saying, "[I]t's a film of no-holds-barred language, passion and rage, but it's a move away from genre, more a chamber drama than action movie in which violence is more psychic than physical." He called Keitel "the ideal Ferrara star, his control, volcanic emotions and endless capacity for expressiveness and revelation matching up with those very qualities in Ferrara himself." Madonna, he said, "reveals the vulnerability as well as the strength of both the actress and the character she is playing."

In a mixed review, Peter Travers of Rolling Stone called Keitel "superb" and the film "a mesmerizing jigsaw", but found that "Madonna's take on an emotional crackup comes up snake eyes ... and Ferrara's Dangerous Game stops being worth the playing." However, Owen Gleiberman, giving it a C− grade in Entertainment Weekly, called it "an ego-driven botch, one of those dawdlingly self-important, semi-improvised affairs about a director making a movie that turns out to be just like the one you're watching (or is it the other way around?)", but allowed that, "Madonna isn't embarrassing; she plays down the wax-goddess exhibitionism."

Both Siskel & Ebert disliked the film and it later earned a place on their Worst of 1993 show. Siskel described the film in his initial review as "overwrought baloney" which Ebert concurred with and later denounced it as a "violent egotrip by its director Abel Ferrara."

Year-end lists 
Dishonorable mention – Glenn Lovell, San Jose Mercury News

References

External links
 
 
 
 

1993 films
1993 drama films
1993 independent films
1990s American films
1990s English-language films
1990s Italian films
American drama films
American independent films
English-language Italian films
Italian drama films
Italian independent films
Films about actors
Films about adultery in the United States
Films about film directors and producers
Films about filmmaking
Films directed by Abel Ferrara
Films scored by Joe Delia
Films set in Los Angeles
Films shot in Los Angeles
Films shot in New York City
Metro-Goldwyn-Mayer films
Obscenity controversies in film